Novourazayevo (Yañı Urazay) is a rural locality (a village) in Kuntugushevsky Selsoviet, Baltachevsky District, Bashkortostan, Russia. The population was 44 as of 2010. There are 2 streets.

Geography 
Novourazayevo is located 17 km southeast of Starobaltachevo (the district's administrative centre) by road. Yantimirovo is the nearest rural locality.

References 

Rural localities in Baltachevsky District